Exostoma labiatum, the Burmese bat catfish, is a species of sisorid catfish from India.

References
Talwar, P.K. and A.G. Jhingran, 1991. Inland fishes of India and adjacent countries. Volume 2. A.A. Balkema, Rotterdam.

Catfish of Asia
Fish of India
Taxa named by John McClelland (doctor)
Fish described in 1842
Sisoridae